The Leputing is a restaurant in Da'an District, Taipei, Taiwan.

History
The restaurant building used to be the dormitory used by the officials of Forestry Bureau of the Japanese government constructed in the 1920s. In 2013, the Department of Cultural Affairs of the Taipei City Government appointed Lead Jade Life & Culture to manage the abandoned building. Restoration works then commenced for 1.5 years.

Architecture
The 1-story restaurant building was constructed with Nishikicho Japanese-style architecture. It spreads over an area of 600 m2.

Transportation
The restaurant is accessible within walking distance north from Guting Station of Taipei Metro.

See also
 Taiwanese cuisine

References

External links

 

Buildings and structures in Taipei
Restaurants in Taiwan
Taiwanese restaurants